SK7MQ also known as SK7RNQ B is a D-STAR Gateway enabled HAM repeater, located in Glumslöv, Landskrona Municipality, Sweden. It is set to transmit and receive on the  UHF radio band.
It is currently held and maintained by its founder: Repeatergruppen SK7MQ, known as a part of "Österlens sändaramatörer".

History

SK7MQ or also known as SK7RNQ B, is a complementary UHF repeater to the SK7RNQ C repeater which is transmitting on the 2m radio band.
SK7MQ had its first launch in July 2010, and was on 25 September 2010 that the gateway was connected to the US Trust Server network,
making it possible to establish worldwide connections between other D-STAR gateway enabled repeaters through TCP/IP.
The first transatlantic D-STAR QSO on SK7MQ were made between SM7IOE and KC5NID at September 27, 2010 via Reflector 001-C, also known as the "D-STAR Mega Repeater".

As of 2011, Repeatergruppen SK7RNQ is the fastest deploying D-STAR group within Sweden, currently owning and maintaining two RP2C controlled D-STAR repeaters and one experimental GMSK HotSpot.
In the middle of March 2011, the first 23 cm D-STAR repeater in northern Europe will be installed in Malmö Municipality, Sweden by Repeatergruppen SK7MQ.
The repeater will act as a pure PS (Digital Data) repeater, and will at first be experimentally used by SA7AXO and SM7IOE through the use of the ICOM-ID 23 cm transceiver.
In addition to the 23 cm repeater, a 70 cm D-STAR repeater will be installed at the same QTH with the aim to provide portable D-STAR users full coverage within Malmö.

Technical information

The SK7MQ repeater is transmitting on 434.47500 MHz (a.k.a. the 70-centimeter band) with a negative offset by 2 MHz. The antenna position height is 120 meters over sea level.
The gateway hardware for the D-STAR transmitting system is the ID-RP2C connector unit in combination with the ID-RP4000V UHF DV Exciter.
At first the repeater gave out a measured effect of 25W, but a recently added PA increased the effect to 90W, improving the packet loss resistance and thus extending the transmitted range. The D-STAR gateway has its default reflector set to REF-031A, which collects all district 7 repeaters (southern part within Sweden) into one unique intranet. By a simple metadata command, the repeater can switch between REF-031B or C for instant coverage of the middle or northern districts.
In order to be able to use the D-STAR gateway on the repeater, each HAM operator must apply for an approval within the US Trust Server network, which is done at the registration webpage at any US Trust Server connected gateway repeater.
By doing so, the system becomes much more prone to un-authorized users and non-licensed operators.

SK7MQ Administrators

SA7AXO (Patrik Olsson) - Antenna technician.
SM7IOE (Johnny Nilsson) - Hardware engineer.

References

Packet radio
Communications in Sweden